The 1985 Arizona Wildcats baseball team represented the University of Arizona in the 1985 NCAA Division I baseball season. The Wildcats played their home games at Wildcat Field. The team was coached by Jerry Kindall in his 13th season at Arizona.

The Wildcats won the West II Regional to advanced to the College World Series, where they were defeated by the Stanford Cardinal.

Roster

Schedule 

! style="" | Regular Season
|- valign="top" 

|- align="center" bgcolor="#ccffcc"
| 1 || January 28 ||  || Wildcat Field • Tucson, Arizona || 16–8 || 1–1 || –
|- align="center" bgcolor="#ffcccc"
| 2 || January 29 || at Grand Canyon || Brazell Field • Phoenix, Arizona || 7–14 || 1–1 || –
|- align="center" bgcolor="#ccffcc"
| 3 || January 30 || Grand Canyon || Wildcat Field • Tucson, Arizona || 13–3 || 2–1 || –
|- align="center" bgcolor="#ccffcc"
| 4 || January 31 ||  || Wildcat Field • Tucson, Arizona || 13–5 || 3–1 || –
|-

|- align="center" bgcolor="#ccffcc"
| 5 || February 1 || New Mexico State || Wildcat Field • Tucson, Arizona || 22–8 || 4–1 || –
|- align="center" bgcolor="#ccffcc"
| 6 || February 2 || New Mexico State || Wildcat Field • Tucson, Arizona || 11–3 || 5–1 || –
|- align="center" bgcolor="#ccffcc"
| 7 || February 5 ||  || Wildcat Field • Tucson, Arizona || 13–7 || 6–1 || –
|- align="center" bgcolor="#ccffcc"
| 8 || February 6 || Cal State Dominguez Hills || Wildcat Field • Tucson, Arizona || 7–6 || 7–1 || –
|- align="center" bgcolor="#ccffcc"
| 9 || February 7 ||  || Wildcat Field • Tucson, Arizona || 26–0 || 8–1 || –
|- align="center" bgcolor="#ccffcc"
| 10 || February 8 || San Diego || Wildcat Field • Tucson, Arizona || 14–4 || 9–1 || –
|- align="center" bgcolor="#ccffcc"
| 11 || February 9 || San Diego || Wildcat Field • Tucson, Arizona || 11–3 || 10–1 || –
|- align="center" bgcolor="#ccffcc"
| 12 || February 11 ||  || Wildcat Field • Tucson, Arizona || 7–5 || 11–1 || –
|- align="center" bgcolor="#ccffcc"
| 13 || February 12 || UTEP || Wildcat Field • Tucson, Arizona || 4–2 || 12–1 || –
|- align="center" bgcolor="#ffcccc"
| 14 || February 14 || at  || Titan Field • Fullerton, California || 4–7 || 12–2 || –
|- align="center" bgcolor="#ccffcc"
| 15 || February 15 || at Cal State Fullerton || Titan Field • Fullerton, California || 5–2 || 13–2 || –
|- align="center" bgcolor="#ccffcc"
| 16 || February 16 || at Cal State Fullerton || Titan Field • Fullerton, California || 11–7 || 14–2 || –
|- align="center" bgcolor="#ccffcc"
| 17 || February 18 ||  || Wildcat Field • Tucson, Arizona || 16–5 || 15–2 || –
|- align="center" bgcolor="#ccffcc"
| 18 || February 19 || Santa Clara || Wildcat Field • Tucson, Arizona || 7–5 || 16–2 || –
|- align="center" bgcolor="#ffcccc"
| 19 || February 20 || Santa Clara || Wildcat Field • Tucson, Arizona || 9–12 || 16–3 || –
|- align="center" bgcolor="#ccffcc"
| 20 || February 22 ||  || Wildcat Field • Tucson, Arizona || 13–2 || 17–3 || –
|- align="center" bgcolor="#ccffcc"
| 21 || February 22 || San Diego State || Wildcat Field • Tucson, Arizona || 17–6 || 18–3 || –
|- align="center" bgcolor="#ccffcc"
| 22 || February 23 || San Diego State || Wildcat Field • Tucson, Arizona || 8–7 || 19–3 || –
|- align="center" bgcolor="#ccffcc"
| 23 || February 25 ||  || Wildcat Field • Tucson, Arizona || 8–5 || 20–3 || –
|- align="center" bgcolor="#ccffcc"
| 24 || February 25 || Westmont || Wildcat Field • Tucson, Arizona || 15–2 || 21–3 || –
|-

|- align="center" bgcolor="#ffcccc"
| 25 || March 1 || at  || Jackie Robinson Stadium • Los Angeles, California || 2–3 || 21–4 || 0–1
|- align="center" bgcolor="#ffcccc"
| 26 || March 2 || at UCLA || Jackie Robinson Stadium • Los Angeles, California || 4–15 || 21–5 || 0–2
|- align="center" bgcolor="#ffcccc"
| 27 || March 3 || at UCLA || Jackie Robinson Stadium • Los Angeles, California || 7–11 || 21–6 || 0–3
|- align="center" bgcolor="#ccffcc"
| 28 || March 4 ||  || Wildcat Field • Tucson, Arizona || 13–8 || 22–6 || 0–3
|- align="center" bgcolor="#ccffcc"
| 29 || March 5 || North Carolina || Wildcat Field • Tucson, Arizona || 13–5 || 23–6 || 0–3
|- align="center" bgcolor="#ffcccc"
| 30 || March 6 || North Carolina || Wildcat Field • Tucson, Arizona || 7–10 || 23–7 || 0–3
|- align="center" bgcolor="#ccffcc"
| 31 || March 8 ||  || Wildcat Field • Tucson, Arizona  || 8–6 || 24–7 || 1–3
|- align="center" bgcolor="#ffcccc"
| 32 || March 9 || Southern California || Wildcat Field • Tucson, Arizona || 10–12 || 24–8 || 1–4
|- align="center" bgcolor="#ccffcc"
| 33 || March 10 || Southern California || Wildcat Field • Tucson, Arizona || 8–1 || 25–8 || 2–4
|- align="center" bgcolor="#ffcccc"
| 34 || March 15 || at  || Evans Diamond • Berkeley, California || 2–9 || 25–9 || 2–5
|- align="center" bgcolor="#ccffcc"
| 35 || March 16 || at California || Evans Diamond • Berkeley, California || 5–3 || 26–9 || 3–5
|- align="center" bgcolor="#ccffcc"
| 36 || March 17 || at California || Evans Diamond • Berkeley, California || 6–4 || 27–9 || 4–5
|- align="center" bgcolor="#ccffcc"
| 37 || March 19 ||  || Wildcat Field • Tucson, Arizona || 15–6 || 28–9 || 4–5
|- align="center" bgcolor="#ccffcc"
| 38 || March 19 || Colorado State || Wildcat Field • Tucson, Arizona || 14–1 || 29–9 || 4–5
|- align="center" bgcolor="#ccffcc"
| 39 || March 20 || Colorado State || Wildcat Field • Tucson, Arizona || 16–2 || 30–9 || 4–5
|- align="center" bgcolor="#ffcccc"
| 40 || March 23 || Stanford || Wildcat Field • Tucson, Arizona || 5–20 || 30–10 || 4–6
|- align="center" bgcolor="#ffcccc"
| 41 || March 23 || Stanford || Wildcat Field • Tucson, Arizona || 6–10 || 30–11 || 4–7
|- align="center" bgcolor="#ccffcc"
| 42 || March 24 || Stanford || Wildcat Field • Tucson, Arizona || 13–8 || 31–11 || 5–7
|- align="center" bgcolor="#ffcccc"
| 43 || March 29 || at   || Hubert H. Humphrey Metrodome • Minneapolis, Minnesota || 4–5 || 31–12 || 5–7
|- align="center" bgcolor="#ffcccc"
| 44 || March 30 || vs  || Hubert H. Humphrey Metrodome • Minneapolis, Minnesota || 2–3 || 31–13 || 5–7
|- align="center" bgcolor="#ffcccc"
| 45 || March 30 || vs  || Hubert H. Humphrey Metrodome • Minneapolis, Minnesota || 2–9 || 31–14 || 5–7
|- align="center" bgcolor="#ccffcc"
| 46 || March 31 || at Minnesota || Hubert H. Humphrey Metrodome • Minneapolis, Minnesota || 6–2 || 32–14 || 5–7
|-

|- align="center" bgcolor="#ccffcc"
| 47 || April 5 ||  || Wildcat Field • Tucson, Arizona || 13–12 || 33–14 || 6–7
|- align="center" bgcolor="#ffcccc"
| 48 || April 6 || Arizona State || Wildcat Field • Tucson, Arizona || 10–19 || 33–15 || 6–8
|- align="center" bgcolor="#ccffcc"
| 49 || April 7 || Arizona State || Wildcat Field • Tucson, Arizona || 11–4 || 34–15 || 7–8
|- align="center" bgcolor="#ccffcc"
| 50 || April 12 || at Stanford || Sunken Diamond • Stanford, California || 7–5 || 35–15 || 8–8
|- align="center" bgcolor="#ffcccc"
| 51 || April 13 || at Stanford || Sunken Diamond • Stanford, California || 8–20 || 35–16 || 8–9
|- align="center" bgcolor="#ffcccc"
| 52 || April 14 || at Stanford || Sunken Diamond • Stanford, California || 1–11 || 35–17 || 8–10
|- align="center" bgcolor="#ccffcc"
| 53 || April 19 || at Southern California || Dedeaux Field • Los Angeles, California  || 5–2 || 36–17 || 9–10
|- align="center" bgcolor="#ccffcc"
| 54 || April 20 || at Southern California || Dedeaux Field • Los Angeles, California || 7–3 || 37–17 || 10–10
|- align="center" bgcolor="#ccffcc"
| 55 || April 21 || at Southern California || Dedeaux Field • Los Angeles, California || 11–1 || 38–17 || 11–10
|- align="center" bgcolor="#ccffcc"
| 56 || April 26 || California || Wildcat Field • Tucson, Arizona || 9–6 || 39–17 || 12–10
|- align="center" bgcolor="#ccffcc"
| 57 || April 27 || California || Wildcat Field • Tucson, Arizona || 5–2 || 40–17 || 13–10
|- align="center" bgcolor="#ccffcc"
| 58 || April 28 || California || Wildcat Field • Tucson, Arizona || 9–8 || 41–17 || 14–10
|-

|- align="center" bgcolor="#ccffcc"
| 59 || May 3 || UCLA || Wildcat Field • Tucson, Arizona || 14–11 || 42–17 || 15–10
|- align="center" bgcolor="#ccffcc"
| 60 || May 4 || UCLA || Wildcat Field • Tucson, Arizona || 14–4 || 43–17 || 16–10
|- align="center" bgcolor="#ffcccc"
| 61 || May 5 || UCLA || Wildcat Field • Tucson, Arizona || 4–11 || 43–18 || 16–11
|- align="center" bgcolor="#ffcccc"
| 62 || May 10 || at Arizona State || Packard Stadium • Tempe, Arizona || 3–13 || 43–19 || 15–13
|- align="center" bgcolor="#ccffcc"
| 63 || May 11 || at Arizona State || Packard Stadium • Tempe, Arizona || 7–5 || 44–19 || 16–13
|- align="center" bgcolor="#ffcccc"
| 64 || May 12 || at Arizona State || Packard Stadium • Tempe, Arizona || 3–15 || 44–20 || 17–13
|-

|-
|-
! style="" | Postseason
|- valign="top"

|- align="center" bgcolor="#ccffcc"
| 65 || May 24 || vs  || Pete Beiden Field • Fresno, California || 7–3 || 45–20 || 17–13
|- align="center" bgcolor="#ccffcc"
| 66 || May 25 || at  || Pete Beiden Field • Fresno, California || 6–0 || 46–20 || 17–13
|- align="center" bgcolor="#ccffcc"
| 67 || May 26 || at Washington State || Pete Beiden Field • Fresno, California || 10–3 || 47–20 || 17–13
|-

|- align="center" bgcolor="#ffcccc"
| 68 || June 1 || vs Texas || Johnny Rosenblatt Stadium • Omaha, Nebraska || 1–2 || 47–21 || 17–13
|- align="center" bgcolor="#ffcccc"
| 69 || June 2 || vs Stanford || Johnny Rosenblatt Stadium • Omaha, Nebraska || 2–9 || 47–22 || 17–13
|-

Awards and honors 
Joe Magrane
 Third Team All-American Baseball America
 First Team All-Pac-10 South Division

Todd Trafton
 First Team All-Pac-10 South Division

References 

Arizona Wildcats baseball seasons
Arizona Wildcats baseball
College World Series seasons
Arizona